Falstaff is an Italian-language opera by Michael William Balfe, written to a libretto by Manfredo Maggioni, given at Her Majesty's Theatre, London, 19 July 1838.

Recordings
Falstaff Marcel Vanaud (Falstaff), Majella Cullagh (Mistress Ford), Sam McElroy (Ford), Barry Banks (Fenton) RTÉ Concert Orchestra, conducted by Marco Zambelli, in association with Opera Ireland for RTÉ

External links
 Céline Frigau Manning: Le Falstaff de Manfredo Maggioni et Michael Balfe : façonner un opéra italien pour le public anglais. Revue LISA, December 2011

References

Operas
Italian-language operas
Operas by Michael Balfe
1838 operas